Deiner Córdoba (born 21 April 1992) is a Colombian professional footballer who plays as a midfielder. He last played for Saif Sporting Club in the Bangladesh Football Premier League.

Career

In April 2017 he joined Bangladesh Football Premier League side Saif Sporting Club. He played 11 matches for the club and scored 2 goals. After the first half of the league the club replaced him with English forward Charlie Sheringham. However the club replaced him in January 2018 with Wedson Anselme. He played both matches of the club in the 2018 AFC Cup qualifying play-offs against T.C. Sports Club.

International

U-17 world cup Nigeria 2009
He has represented Colombia in the 2009 FIFA U-17 World Cup. He played all the matches for his country in the group stage and knockout phase. He made his debut in the first group stage match of the competition on 25 October 2009 against Netherlands U-17 and scored a goal in the 72nd minute.

References

1992 births
Living people
Colombian footballers
Colombian expatriate footballers
Colombian expatriate sportspeople in Bangladesh
Expatriate footballers in Bangladesh
Association football midfielders
Bangladesh Football Premier League players
Deportivo Pereira footballers
Colorado Rapids players
Boyacá Chicó F.C. footballers
Saif SC players
C.D. Guastatoya players
People from Risaralda Department